Raffles Europejski Warsaw, commonly known as Hotel Europejski (The European Hotel), is a historic five-star luxury hotel located in the city centre of Warsaw, Poland. At the time of its opening in 1857 it was one of the most modern and luxurious European hotels.

Situated along the Royal Route, the building was designed by Polish-Italian architect Enrico Marconi and has since been one of  Warsaw's architectural symbols. Badly damaged during World War II, it was systematically rebuilt at a great expense throughout the 1950s, reopening as a hotel in 1962. Managed by Raffles Hotels & Resorts, it reopened on 1 June 2018 after extensive renovation with 106 rooms, restaurant, bar, spa and Lourse pâtisserie, as well as offices on the top two floors and a luxury shopping center.

Overview
Facilities include an art gallery and a coffee and pastry shop. The rooms vary in size and shape and most have views overlooking historic parts of Warsaw, including the Royal Tract and the Pilsudski Square.

History

Early years
The hotel originally opened on January 1, 1857. Designed by Enrico Marconi, it was one of the most luxurious hotels in the Russian Empire, which stretched from Europe to Alaska. From 1915, the architect Antoni Jawornicki, was responsible for many of the upgrades to the hotel including moving the main entrance and building two ballrooms in the courtyard. In 1921, the hotel's owners, the Przeździecki and Czetwertyński families formed the joint stock company, Hotel Europejski Spółka Akcyjna (HESA).

World War II
The hotel was renamed the Europäisches Hotel by the Germans during the occupation in World War II and used to house Wehrmacht officers exclusively whilst keeping a large portion of the pre-war Polish staff. It was severely damaged after the Warsaw Uprising in December 1944 and January 1945 by the retreating Germans.

Post WWII nationalization and reconstruction
In 1945, after the liberation of Warsaw, the original owners received permission from the government to rebuild the hotel and commenced by setting up a restaurant in the surviving section of the building. However, before they could rebuild the whole hotel, the property was seized by the government in 1948 as a result of the Bierut Decrees. The building was rebuilt during 1949-1951 to designs by Bohdan Pniewski to serve as a military school. Major structural changes included adding a balustrade along the top, and reconstruction of the ruined sections of the exterior. Many surviving elements of the interior were removed, including the grand staircase and ballrooms, replacing them with dormitories, classrooms and a gymnasium. The building served as the Military Political Academy (Akademia Wojskowa Polityczna) from 1951-1954 and then as offices for the Ministry of Transport. In 1956 the Polish government decided to return the building to its former use as a hotel. From 1956–1957, the empty building was used to house Jewish emigrants from the Soviet Union.

The building was transferred to the Orbis state tourist company in 1957 and converted back to a hotel, with Bohdan Pniewski again serving as architect, along with Bohdan Kijowicz. The resulting hotel had 260 rooms and 13 suites. It reopened to guests on July 2, 1962 as the Orbis Hotel Europejski. In 1965, The Golden Gate Quartet performed their only concert in Poland here.

During the following decades, some of the notable guests of the hotel included: Robert Kennedy, Marlene Dietrich, The Rolling Stones, Indira Gandhi, Günter Grass, Artur Rubinstein, Mstislav Rostropovich, Czesław Miłosz and Lech Wałęsa.

After the fall of communism, in 1993, the heirs of the hotel's original owners sued to regain the hotel from the state-run Orbis Hotels chain. The case took 12 years, as Orbis claimed they had constructed the current building and invested a great deal of money in it. The heirs were ultimately successful in their lawsuit, and the hotel was closed down by Orbis on June 30, 2005. The hand-over was completed later that year on September 1. While preparations were made for a complete restoration, spaces on the ground floor were rented out to shops and cafes, and the former hotel rooms and apartments in the building were rented out as offices. The structure was completely closed in 2013 in anticipation of the impending reconstruction.

Restoration
Reconstruction began in July 2013 and the building reopened in May 2018 with a 106-room hotel managed by Raffles Hotels & Resorts as Raffles Europejski Warsaw, 3,000 m² of retail space on the ground floor, and 6,500 m² of Class A office space on the top two floors, 4,000 m² of which is operated by WeWork as shared office space.

Gallery

See also
Architecture of Warsaw
Architecture of Poland
Hotel Bristol, Warsaw
Luxury hotel

References

External links

 Official website of The Europejski
 Official website of the Raffles Europejski Warsaw

Raffles Hotels & Resorts
Hotels in Warsaw
Hotel buildings completed in 1857
Hotels established in 1857
Hotel Europejski